The Inaugural awards took place in 1992. There were five categories Local Journalism, Periodicals, Print journalism, Radio and Television.

Sir Trevor McDonald, TV Broadcaster and journalist, said at the awards "Amnesty persists where journalism leaves off. We visit these scenes and then move on. Amnesty has the virtue of sticking with the story and making sure the truth comes out,"

The Overall winner was “Cold Blood - the massacre of East Timor”, produced by Peter Gordon for First Tuesday, Yorkshire Television.

The judges also specially mentioned the work of Christopher Olgiati, “The Nightrider” (HBO title "Southern Justice: The Murder of Medgar Evers ").

1992 Awards

See also

References

External links
 Amnesty International UK (AIUK) website
 Amnesty International UK Media Awards at the AIUK Website
 Amnesty International Website

Amnesty International
British journalism awards
Human rights awards
1992 awards in the United Kingdom